Arthur Oliver Beaumont (8 December 1904 – 8 February 1980) was an Australian rules footballer who played for the Melbourne Football Club in the Victorian Football League (VFL).

Notes

External links 

Art Beaumont's playing statistics from The VFA Project

1904 births
Australian rules footballers from Victoria (Australia)
Melbourne Football Club players
Prahran Football Club players
1980 deaths